Luca-Milan Zander (born 9 August 1995) is a German professional footballer who plays as a full-back for FC St. Pauli. He has represented Germany at U15, U17, and U20 youth levels.

Club career

Werder Bremen
Zander joined Werder Bremen in 2006 from SC Weyhe. He made his debut for Werder Bremen II on 2 November 2014 against Hamburger SV II.

On 26 September 2015, he made his first team debut in a Bundesliga game against Bayer Leverkusen replacing Felix Kroos after 56 minutes in a 3–0 home loss.

FC St. Pauli (loan)
In June 2017, Zander agreed to join FC St. Pauli on loan for two seasons.

FC St. Pauli
In May 2019, it was announced Zander would be joining FC St. Pauli permanently for the 2019–20 season. The transfer fee paid to Werder Bremen was reported as €400,000.

International career
Zander is a youth international for Germany having represented the country at U15, U17, and U20 levels.

References

Living people
1995 births
Association football midfielders
German footballers
Germany youth international footballers
SV Werder Bremen players
SV Werder Bremen II players
FC St. Pauli players
Bundesliga players
2. Bundesliga players
3. Liga players